Selles may refer to:

Communes in France
 Selles, Eure, in the Eure département
 Selles, Marne, in the Marne département
 Selles, Pas-de-Calais, in the Pas-de-Calais département 
 Selles, Haute-Saône, in the Haute-Saône département
 Selles-Saint-Denis, in the Loir-et-Cher département 
 Selles-sur-Cher, in the Loir-et-Cher département 
 Selles-sur-Nahon, in the Indre  département

Other
 Selles-sur-Cher cheese, a French goats' milk cheese

See also 
 Selle (disambiguation)